The 1939 Belgian Grand Prix was a Grand Prix motor race held on 25 June 1939 at Spa-Francorchamps.

Richard Seaman crashed into a tree between Clubhouse and La Source hairpin, causing the fuel line to break. Fuel rushed over the car and the car caught fire. Seaman couldn't move because his right hand was broken and he was also trapped by his steering wheel. After a minute of futile rescue attempts, a Belgian soldier walked into the blaze and freed Seaman. However, he had suffered burns on sixty percent of the body and Britain's most successful pre-war driver died before midnight.

Classification

References

Belgian Grand Prix
Belgian Grand Prix
Grand Prix, 1939